The Clio Renault Sport (or Clio RS for short) is a hot hatch produced  by Renault Sport since 1998, the high-performance division of French automaker, Renault. It is based on the Clio supermini.

The engine has remained throughout most generations of the vehicle, a 2.0-litre straight-4 petrol engine with an FF layout and a three-door hatchback body style. However, the latest generation has changed to a 1.6-litre engine with a five-door hatchback body style.

Clio II RS (172 Gen 1)       
In 1999 Renault presented the first officially branded RenaultSport Clio, the third Clio produced by the RenaultSport division succeeding the Clio 16V and Clio Williams.

This new Clio, the 172, was based on the 3 door Clio II shell however had numerous features over the standard car, including wider arches, restyled bumpers, side skirts and 15-inch OZ F1 alloy wheels.

Power was delivered by the F4R 730 engine, a 2.0-liter 16-valve Inline 4 engine with a Variable valve timing (VVT) system via a dephaser on the intake camshaft pulley. Power was delivered to the wheels via a JC5-089 five-speed manual gearbox.

The 172 also featured interior changes over the standard car, including Half Leather, Half Alcantara seats embossed with the RenaultSport logo and the car also came standard with manually controlled Air Conditioning.

A limited edition of the Phase 1 172 was produced and known as the Clio 172 Exclusive. It was limited to 172 units, all 172 of this "Exclusive" edition were 296 Scarab Green, featured BBS alloy wheels and a full-leather interior as opposed to the half-leather half Alcantara seats featured in the standard car.

Clio II RS (172 Gen 2) 
In 2001 the interior and exterior of the Clio II were face-lifted, the Clio RS followed suit shortly after.

This facelift of the Clio 172 included redesigned front and rear bumpers, the front bumper falling in line with the style of the face-lifted Clio II. The rear bumper was now less rounded and featured a strip of ABS plastic effectively splitting the bumper into two. The lights, bonnet and boot lid were also matched to the face-lifted Clio II.

The interior was also changed to closer match that of the face-lifted Clio II, the seats were slightly revised however still featured the same Half Leather, Half Alcantara fabrics and the embossed RenaultSport logo. One new feature that the Phase 2 172 featured was automatic climate control as opposed to the manual air-conditioning featured in the Phase 1.

The dashboard featured Silver interior trims and the steering wheel included a plastic insert featuring the RenaultSport logo. The gear shifter was changed from the metal ball featured on the Phase 1 to a Leather wrapped shifter with a silver colored insert on the top.

The Phase 2 172 also featured increased equipment including automatic Xenon headlights and headlight washers, Rain Sensing wipers a six-disc CD changer, and it also included side-impact airbags integrated into the seats. The 15-inch OZ F1 alloy wheels were also replaced with a 16-inch Alloy Wheel of Renault's own design.

The facelift of the 172 also brought about a number of changes to the engine of the car. A revised version of the F4R used, the F4R 736, this featured a revised cylinder head with the exhaust ports being approximately 30% smaller than those featured on the Phase 1 172. The airbox was also redesigned to be much more square than the original airbox.

A revised version of the JC5 gearbox, the JC5-129 was introduced in this version of the Clio 172, which revised JC5 featured a shorter final drive to counter the increased weight of the face-lifted 172.

The catalytic converter, which on the PH1 172 had been dual barrel was reduced to a single barrel and featured 2 lambda sensors, one before and one after the catalytic converter. The biggest change to the PH2 172 over the PH1 was the introduction of an electric throttle. This meant the Idle Control Valve of the PH1 was no longer required leading to a minor redesign of the intake manifold.

Clio II RS (172 Cup) 
In 2002 Renault released the 172 Cup, which bore the chassis code CB1N and was known by Renault as the "sport lightweight version".

The vast majority of cars were produced in D43 Mondial Blue (metallic) with a limited run of around 90 cars being produced in 640 Iceberg Silver (metallic). The Cup, originally built for Gr.N homologation of the Clio 172 was differentiated from the "non cup" 172 by its lack of many of the luxuries included in the regular car. Instead of the leather / Alcantara seats instead the same style seat was upholstered in a durable but low-cost fabric, the automatic Xenon headlights were replaced by manually controlled halogen units and the washer jets replaced with blanks. The rain sensing wipers and solar reflective coated windscreen were also omitted from the 172 Cup.

However the car had features not before seen on a production version of the 172, which included lightweight 16-inch Speedline Turini alloy wheels, matte blue door strips, ABS plastic "Cup" front splitter and a restyled "Cup" rear spoiler. The dash strips which were silver on the regular car were painted to match the outside of the car.

One of the main features of the 172 Cup was its significant weight saving, having a kerb weight of 1021kg, making it the lightest of 172 versions produced. This was achieved by the removal of a majority of sound deadening from the car alongside thinner glass to reduce weight even further. One large difference was also the lack of air conditioning which was a standard fit component on the regular 172, which typically led to the cup producing more power due to the engine having less ancillaries to drive. This however was reintroduced as an optional extra later in the production run of the Cup. The 0–60 time of the 172 Cup was officially marketed by Renault as being 6.5 seconds; however AutoCar Magazine reportedly timed the 0–60 at 6.2 seconds which if this were the case would make the 172 Cup the second fastest road going Clio produced at the time of this article, second to only the V6.

Many enthusiasts regard the 172 Cup as the last "hardcore" hot hatch due to its lack of anti-lock brakes; the car also featured modified suspension which gave it a wider track thanks to modified wishbones, the car also sat lower than standard and featured stiffer shocks and springs, the suspension geometry was revised to suit these components and to mean that the steering response was increased, this also lead to an increase in oversteer thanks to the lack of weight and revised geometry.

Due to the lack of ABS the brake bias of the car was fixed by way of disconnecting the rear axle compensator, within the UK this often lead to the cars failing the MOT test, VOSA eventually issued an advisory to prevent this from happening.

Clio II RS (182) 

2004 marked yet another refresh of the Clio II. The inserts of the headlights were changed from Black to Grey, new wheels styles were introduced and new colour options were added with others being dropped. The basic design of the car stayed the same with only minor changes. The Six-Disc CD changer was dropped as standard equipment however was still available as a cost option.

This refresh marked the introduction of cruise control and Electronic Stability Program (ESP) as standard equipment.

The Clio RS featured a lot more changes than the regular Clio. The engine was again revised and became the F4R 738. The difference between the F4R 738 and F4R 736 was a revised oil breather setup meaning the intake manifold found on a 172 would not fit a 182. Thanks to a number of other changes this engine produced  . 
This increase in power was thanks to the addition of a 4-2-1 Manifold and high flow 200 cell sports catalytic converter. The spare wheel well was removed and replaced with a flat floor to make way for the new dual exit exhaust featured on the 182.

Minor revisions were made to the interior, the perforated texture of the Alcantara on the seats now featured white dots. The car also featured a new 8 spoke wheel design which came in Silver on a regular car and Anthracite on a "Cup Packed" car.

The rarest optional extra available was the Carminat Sat-Nav which was fitted to very few cars. However, the unit wasn't a popular option due to its high cost and rumoured poor performance compared to aftermarket options.

The "Cup" Front Splitter and "Cup" Spoiler originally fitted to the 172 Cup made a reappearance as a cost option known as the Cup Style Pack. This was one of two cup packs available, the other being the Cup Chassis.

This Cup Chassis pack included a strengthened hub with 60mm spacing on the strut bolt holes as opposed 54mm on non cup packed cars. The Cup Chassis also featured lowered suspension with stiffer shocks and springs and an anthracite version of the standard alloy wheels.

Clio II RS (182 Cup) 
The Clio 182 could also be ordered in a more race focused than 'base' RS model called "Cup Specification", this was available in just two colours, J45 Racing Blue and D38 Inferno Orange, however came as Standard with the Cup Chassis and Cup Style Pack.

The 182 Cup lacked the automatic Xenon headlights and headlight washer jets, climate control (rear footwell heater vents were also removed), illuminated sun visors, Solar Reflective Windscreen and Automatic Wipers.

The leather / Alcantara seats were replaced with cloth items and the rear bench was downgraded to match. The engine cover and sill plates were removed and the steering wheel was downgraded to no longer include the RenaultSport Logo or rubber thumb grips.

Carpet and headlining were downgraded to basic specification and even the documentation wallet was changed from faux leather to cloth. Sound deadening was removed from the 182 Cup, the horn was downgraded from a twin to single unit and the interior light no longer included a map reading function.

Despite all of these reductions in specification the 182 Cup was still considerably heavier than the previous 172 Cup, meaning this version of the Clio II RS was considered one of the least desirable versions.

Clio II RS (182 Trophy) 

The final version of the Clio 182 was known as the 182 Trophy. This version was based on the 182 Cup and featured the same strengthened hubs with 60 mm bolt spacing. Originally only 500 cars were to be produced for the UK market however an additional 50 were produced to be sold in Switzerland. At the time, believing there was no market for this version of the Clio, the Marketing Department of Renault France failed to order a 182 Trophy.

The 182 Trophy included 16 Inch Speedline Turini Alloy wheels as seen on the 172 Cup, the Spoiler from the Clio 255 V6, Recaro Trendline seats and exclusive 727 Capsicum Red Paint with Trophy Decals lacquered onto the Side skirts. Each car had an individually numbered plaque on the base of the driver's seat.

The biggest difference however between the 182 Cup and 182 Trophy was the inclusion of Sachs Remote-Reservoir dampers. The basic principle of a Remote-Reservoir damper is that because there is a separate reservoir for the gas or oil which fills the shock they can either be of a reduced length or can house a longer rod, this means that the sizing of the shock can be optimised for the application in which it is being used.

These changes definitely made a big difference to the 182 Trophy and have led to its being heralded as one of the best hot hatches of all time and it won Evo Magazines "People's Performance Car of The Year" 2005, whilst also beating off rivals such as the Lamborghini Gallardo and other exotica in an Evo Magazine Group Test. AutoCar Magazines front cover from 5 July 2005 simply stated "World's Greatest Hot Hatch".

Clio III RS (197) 

The car is heavier than its predecessor, but the acceleration figures are slightly improved due to a combination of more power, torque and the new six-speed gearbox with shorter gearing according to the official figures published on the Renaultsport website www.renaultsport.co.uk.

Clio III RS (200) 

The facelifted Clio III is further enhanced with the inclusion of a front splitter and the engine now produces . This has been made possible by tweaks to the exhaust system, valve timing and ECU also stated to give a slight increase in fuel economy. Acceleration figures are expected to be slightly improved due to shorter gearing in 1, 2 and 3 and enhancements have been made to the cup chassis including making the steering rack more responsive. Cosmetic enhancements include the addition of larger tailpipes protruding slightly from the rear diffuser, i.d. coloured front bumper insert, wing mirror covers and rear diffuser and i.d. interior trim. Renault also introduced a new i.d. paint option of Alien Green.
The 200 is highly regarded by EVO magazine, remaining their hot hatch of choice since 2009. "After the mild disappointment of the Clio 197, Renaultsport has got the Clio back to its very best, producing a cracking small hot hatch more than capable of chasing down supercars on eCOTY 2009 for a top five finish".
It is hailed by CAR Magazine as "the 911 GT3 of hot hatches" and has also remained CAR Magazine's "Best in Class" since its release in 2009 (At time of writing 9-11-2012).

Keeping with an aggressive marketing campaign, Renault have publicly released many limited edition variants of the 200.

Gordini 

The Gordini was the first of the Limited Editions, with 500 limited in the UK and approximately 40 in Australia, but in other countries they were unlimited; it came in two colours: white and blue. The Gordini featured traditional off-centred stripes with a metallic Gordini badge texture along the exterior of the car that stretched from the bonnet over the roof and onto the rear hatch. The steering wheel featured the Gordini stripes and blue stitching throughout the interior. Other interior changes included Gordini leather stitched seats and a blue transmission fabric. The Gordini maintained the original 17" 12-spoke 200 Cup wheels but depending on the colour choice they had the inner sections on the spoke sprayed, blue for the blue Gordini's and Black for the White Gordini's. The Front bumper and rear diffuser were in gloss black and the front F1 Blade was in white for the Blue Gordini's and Grey for the White Gordini's. Apart from the Livery and slight cosmetic changes, the Gordini was mechanically the same as a standard 200 with Cup suspension package.

Silverstone GP 

The Silverstone GP Edition was a special edition production run of 50, exclusive to the UK to celebrate the Silverstone Grand Prix. The 200 Silverstone Edition was released alongside the Twingo Silverstone Edition. It only came in Silverstone Silver and featured the optional extra 17" Renaultsport Speedline Black Alloys which are slightly lighter than the Standard wheels, and ‘Deep Black’ detailing around the car including the bumpers and diffuser, wing mirrors and the roof. The Silverstone GP Edition came standard with Recaro seats and a RS Monitor for logging G-Force and Lap times.

Australian GP 

The Australian GP Edition was a special edition run of only 31, exclusively to Australia to celebrate the Australian Grand Prix. Similar to the Silverstone GP Edition, it featured the ‘Deep Black’ detailing across the car, including the front and rear bumpers, the wing mirrors and the roof. It came with the optional extra Renaultsport 17" Speedline Black alloys, Recaro seats as standard and the RS Monitor. The Australian GP Edition came in Renaults unique ‘Liquid Yellow’ colour that had previously been a huge success on the 197 R27 Limited Editions.

20th Anniversary Special 

The 20th Anniversary special Edition was available in a limited production run of only 20 units during 2010 to celebrate 20 years of the Clio and 10 million sales. It was sold in ‘Pearlescent Givre’ (white). It features the same ‘Deep Black’ detailing of the Silverstone GP and Australian GP editions, with the gloss black roof, front bumper and rear diffuser. The wheels are the black Speedline 17-inch 200 Clio-Cup wheels. The front side vents, the mirrors and the F1 Blade were detailed in anthracite.

Raider 
The Raider Edition, known as the ‘Angel and Demons’ Edition in Australia, featured Renault's first production Matt Paint of either ‘Hologramme Grey’ or ‘Torro Red’. The other features of the Raider edition include Recaro leather seats and larger 18-inch wheels wrapped with Bridgestone REO50A tyres, this had been the first different type of tyre on the 200 series, previously all 200s came with Continental Contact Sport 3s.

Red Bull 
The Red Bull Limited edition celebrated winning the Constructors World championship in 2011 with the RB7s, powered by Renault Engines. The RB Limited Editions feature the 18-inch black alloyed Interlagos alloy wheels wrapped in Bridgestone's REO50A tyres. The body work is painted in black with strong yellow contrasts on the front F1 Blade, rear diffuser and wing mirrors. The production run was limited to 455 cars.

200 Cup features a stiffer and lighter chassis, quicker steering and a lower ride height and has a lower equipment level than the standard Clio Renaultsport 200.

Clio IV RS

Gallery

See also 
 Renault Clio V6 Renault Sport
 Renault Mégane Renault Sport
 Renault Clio Cup

References

External links 

 
 RenaultSport - UK official heritage website

Clio Renault Sport
Sport compact cars
Front-wheel-drive sports cars
2000s cars
Cars introduced in 1998